Onișor Mihai Nicorec (born 28 March 1986) is a Romanian football player who currently plays for Liga IV side Universitatea Oradea. Nicorec played in his career mostly for Hungarian clubs, among others: Győri ETO, Zalaegerszeg and Mezőkövesd, but he played also in Romania for: Rapid II București, Minerul Lupeni and Farul Constanța.

Honours

Club
Győri ETO FC
 Nemzeti Bajnokság I: 2012–13

References

External links
 
 
 Onișor Nicorec at hlsz.hu
 Onișor Nicorec at frf-ajf.ro

1986 births
Living people
People from Târgu Lăpuș
Romanian footballers
Association football midfielders
Liga II players
FC Rapid București players
CS Minerul Lupeni players
FCV Farul Constanța players
Nemzeti Bajnokság I players
Győri ETO FC players
Zalaegerszegi TE players
Mezőkövesdi SE footballers
Cigánd SE players
Szeged-Csanád Grosics Akadémia footballers
Romanian expatriate footballers
Expatriate footballers in Hungary
Romanian expatriate sportspeople in Hungary